Václav Roziňák (December 7, 1922 in Prague, Czechoslovakia – March 1, 1997 in Zürich, Switzerland) was an ice hockey player for the Czechoslovak national team. He won a silver medal at the 1948 Winter Olympics.

In 1950 he was imprisoned with other Czech hockey players by the communist government. His career and careers of his colleagues were ended by the communist regime. After being released from the prison, he emigrated in 1968 to Switzerland.

References

External links

1922 births
1997 deaths
Czechoslovak emigrants to Switzerland
Czechoslovak ice hockey right wingers
HC Sparta Praha players
Ice hockey players at the 1948 Winter Olympics
Medalists at the 1948 Winter Olympics
Olympic ice hockey players of Czechoslovakia
Olympic medalists in ice hockey
Olympic silver medalists for Czechoslovakia
People convicted of treason against Czechoslovakia
Ice hockey people from Prague
Czech ice hockey right wingers
Czech ice hockey coaches
Czechoslovak ice hockey coaches